TRMS may refer to:

 True RMS converter
 The Rachel Maddow Show, abbreviated as TRMS in the show
 Time-resolved mass spectrometry